The 27th Canadian Film Awards were held on October 12, 1975 to honour achievements in Canadian film. The ceremony was hosted by Peter Gzowski.

Due to the Quebec boycott crisis which protested the treatment of films from Quebec at the 25th Canadian Film Awards in 1973, and the resulting cancellation of the awards in 1974, the 1975 awards covered films released in both 1974 and 1975. Accordingly, the Canadian Film Awards committee revived the Film of the Year category, which had not been used since 1970, so that it could name separate Best Picture winners for both 1974 and 1975. In all other categories, however, separate winners were not named for the two years.

Winners

Films
Film of the Year (1974): The Apprenticeship of Duddy Kravitz — International Cinemedia Centre, John Kemeny, Ted Kotcheff director
Film of the Year (1975): Les Ordres (Orders) — Productions Prisma, Bernard Lalonde, Claude Godbout and Guy Dufaux producers
Feature Film: Les Ordres (Orders) — Les Productions Prisma, Bernard Lalonde, Claude Godbout and Guy Dufaux producers
Theatrical Documentary: Janis — Crawley Films, F. R. Crawley producer, Howard Alk and Seaton Findlay directors
Documentary Under 30 Minutes: At 99: A Portrait of Louise Tandy Murch — Sunrise Films, Paul Saltzman and Deepa Mehta producers, Deepa Mehta director
Documentary Over 30 Minutes: Cree Hunters of Mistassini — National Film Board of Canada, Colin Low producer, Tony Ianzelo and Boyce Richardson directors
Theatrical Short: Along These Lines — Immedia Inc., Isabel Ripley and Patrick Watson producers, Peter Pearson director
Animated Short: The Owl Who Married a Goose — National Film Board of Canada, Pierre Moretti producer, Caroline Leaf director
TV Drama: A Bird in the House — Canadian Broadcasting Corporation, Ron Weyman producer
Arts and Experimental: Not awarded

Feature Film Craft Awards
Performance by a Lead Actor: Stuart Gillard - Why Rock the Boat? (NFB)
Performance by a Lead Actress: Margot Kidder - A Quiet Day in Belfast (Twinbay Media) and Black Christmas (Telefilm Canada)
Supporting Actor: Henry Beckman - Why Rock the Boat? (NFB)
Supporting Actress: Lila Kedrova - Eliza's Horoscope (O-Zali Productions)
Art Direction: François Barbeau - Eliza's Horoscope (O-Zali Productions)
Cinematography: Paul Van der Linden - Eliza's Horoscope (O-Zali Productions)
Director: Michel Brault - Les Ordres (Orders) (Productions Prisma)
Film Editing: Stan Cole - Black Christmas (Telefilm Canada)
Sound Editing: Ken Heeley-Ray - Black Christmas (Telefilm Canada)
Music Score: Nick Whitehead - Lions for Breakfast (Burg Productions)
Original Screenplay: Michel Brault - Les Ordres (Orders) (Productions Prisma)
Adapted Screenplay: William Weintraub - Why Rock the Boat? (NFB)
Overall Sound: Patrick Rousseau (recording) and Stephen Dalby (re-recording) - The Apprenticeship of Duddy Kravitz {International Cinemedia Centre), and
Stephen Dalby - Eliza's Horoscope (O-Zali Productions)

Non-Feature Craft Awards
Performance by a Lead Actor: William Hutt - The National Dream (CBC)
Performance by a Lead Actress: Jayne Eastwood - The Collaborators: Deedee (CBC)
Supporting Actor or Actress: Patricia Hamilton - A Bird in the House (CBC)
Art Direction: Not awarded
Cinematography: Kenneth W. Gregg - Next Year in Jerusalem and The Collaborators: Deedee (CBC) and A Bird in the House (CBC)
Direction: Robin Spry - Action: The October Crisis of 1970 {NFB)
Film Editing: Arla Saare - Next Year in Jerusalem
Sound Editing: Barry Greenwald - Metamorphosis (Barry Greenwald Inc.)
Musical Score: Marius Benoit - Le légende du vent
Screenplay: Patricia Watson - A Bird in the House (CBC)
Non-Dramatic Script: Donald Brittain - Dreamland: A History of Early Canadian Movies 1895-1939 {NFB)
Sound Recording: Dan Gibson - Wings in the Wilderness (Dan Gibson Productions)
Sound Re-Recording: Jean-Pierre Joutel - Goldwood (NFB) and Whistling Smith (NFB) and The Owl Who Married a Goose (NFB)

Special awards
For Contribution to Animation: John Straiton - Horseplay
For Contribution to Short Fiction: Michael Asti-Rose - Silent Movie
For Contribution to Feature Film: Gordon Sheppard - Eliza's Horoscope (O-Zali Productions)
Grierson Award: Pierre Juneau "for outstanding contributions to Canadian cinema".

References

Canadian
Canadian Film Awards (1949–1978)
1975 in Canada